Jeffrey Bertan Cohen (born Jeffrey Bertan McMahon; June 25, 1974) is an American attorney and retired child actor best remembered for appearing as Chunk in the 1985 Steven Spielberg production The Goonies. He is a founding partner of law firm Cohen & Gardner.

Early life, family and education
Cohen was born Jeffrey Bertan McMahon on June 25, 1974, in Los Angeles, California. He took his stage name from the maiden name of his mother, Elaine Cohen. He is Jewish.

Cohen attended the University of California, Berkeley, where he received a Bachelor of Science degree in business. Cohen asked Goonies director Richard Donner for a recommendation for his college admissions application. Upon reading Cohen’s notes detailing some of his early life struggles, Donner and his wife offered to pay for Cohen’s college education. Cohen later earned a Juris Doctor from the UCLA School of Law.

Entertainment career

Acting 
Cohen was one of the children describing words to the contestants on the 1982–83 CBS game show Child's Play. During the summer of 1985, he appeared as a celebrity on Body Language. In 1986 he was also in a Disney TV movie, Ask Max. Cohen's sister, Eydie Faye, is a playwright and actress. In the final scene of The Goonies, when the families gather on the beach, Faye has a cameo as Chunk's sister.

Cohen claimed in The Goonies DVD commentary track that every role he played as a child had him wearing either a Hawaiian shirt or a pair of plaid pants, and director Richard Donner had the idea to put him in both for The Goonies. Before The Goonies started filming, Cohen contracted chickenpox. Afraid that they would re-cast the role, he told no one of his illness and showed up to work anyway. According to the commentary track on The Goonies DVD, the chickenpox on Cohen's chest can be seen during the "Truffle Shuffle" sequence.

Law 
Cohen used introductions from Goonies director Richard Donner to get summer jobs on the business side of movie studios; he would say about that time in the ABA Journal story, "I grew up loving The Three Stooges and the Marx Brothers, but suddenly I had a new crop of heroes." He chose to pursue a legal career upon finding out that many of the most important figures on the business side of Hollywood had law degrees. 

After his time at Berkeley, Cohen earned a J.D. degree from the UCLA School of Law in 2000 and later became an entertainment lawyer in Los Angeles. In 2002, he co-founded the Cohen & Gardner firm in Beverly Hills. In the September 24, 2008 issue of Variety, Cohen was profiled in the Dealmakers Impact Report. 

Additionally, Cohen was named to The Hollywood Reporters "Next Generation: Hollywood's Top 35 Executives 35 and Under" in their 2008 November 5 issue. Cohen was named to Variety's Dealmakers Impact Report in 2013.

As of February 2014, he periodically "writes about business, legal and political matters for The Huffington Post and CNBC."

Cohen negotiated the deal of his Goonies co-star Ke Huy Quan for his casting in Everything Everywhere All At Once (2022). Cohen was in attendance at the 95th Academy Awards where Quan won the Academy Award for Best Supporting Actor; Quan publicly thanked Cohen during his acceptance speech, calling him his "Goonies brother for life."

Filmography

References

External links

Homepage for Cohen Gardner LLP
Progress Personified: Chunk from The Goonies is all grown up (October 6, 2016), The Guardian

1974 births
American male child actors
American male film actors
American Jews
Jewish American male actors
California lawyers
Haas School of Business alumni
Male actors from Los Angeles
UCLA School of Law alumni
20th-century American male actors
Living people
21st-century American lawyers